{{Speciesbox
| name = Ergates faber
| image = Ergates.faber.-.calwer.35.02.jpg
| display_parents = 3
| parent_authority = Audinet-Serville, 1832
| genus = Ergates
| species = faber
| authority = (Linnaeus, 1761)
| synonyms = (Genus)
 Cerambyx Gistel 1848 	 
 Caratambyx Gistel 1956
(Species)
 Ergates alkani Demelt 1968
 Prionus bulzanensis Laicharting 1784 
 Prionus crenatus Fabricius 1801 	 
 Ergates grandiceps Tournier 1872 	 
 Prionus obscurus Olivier 1795 	 
 Cerambyx portitor Schrank 1781 	 
 Prionus serrarius Panzer 1793
}}Ergates faber is a species of beetle belonging to the family Cerambycidae. It is the only species in the monotypic genus Ergates''.

It is native to Europe.

References

Prioninae
Beetles described in 1761